The Military ranks of Bhutan are the military insignia used by the Military of Bhutan. Bhutan is a landlocked country, and does therefore not possess a navy. Additionally, Bhutan does not have an air force. India is responsible for military training, arms supplies and the air defense of Bhutan.

Commissioned officer ranks
The rank insignia of commissioned officers.

Other ranks
The rank insignia of non-commissioned officers and enlisted personnel.

References

External links
 

Bhutan
Military of Bhutan